Anguillula may refer to:
 Anguillula (nematode) Ehrenberg, 1831, a genus of nematodes in the family Tripylidae
 Anguillula Mueller, 1786, a genus of nematodes in the family Panagrolaimidae, synonym of Panagrellus
 Anguillula, a genus of Chromista, synonym of Lankesterella